Mafalda Pereira  (born 27 October 1976) is a Portuguese freestyle skier. She competed at the 1998 Winter Olympics in Nagano, in women's aerials.

References

External links 
 

1976 births
Living people
Portuguese female freestyle skiers
Olympic freestyle skiers of Portugal
Freestyle skiers at the 1998 Winter Olympics